Charles & Diana: A Royal Love Story is a 1982 American made-for-television biographical drama film that depicts the wedding of Prince Charles and Lady Diana Spencer. The film was directed by James Goldstone and starred David Robb, Caroline Bliss, Christopher Lee, Rod Taylor, Margaret Tyzack and Mona Washbourne. It originally aired September 17, 1982, on ABC.

Synopsis
The film is about the courtship of Prince Charles and Lady Diana Spencer. Charles is shown to be under intense pressure by his family and the press to find a suitable bride. Before his death in a bomb explosion, Charles' great-uncle, Lord Mountbatten, tells him that he should find a wife. Lady Diana Spencer, who is already in love with Charles, starts to share a flat with her friends in London and begins working at a kindergarten. Due to her friendship with Charles' brother, Prince Andrew, Diana enjoys a close relationship with the Royal Family. She soon catches Charles' eye and the two become romantically involved. Despite constant intrusion by the press, Diana appears to be unbothered and the courtship progresses. Charles eventually proposes, and Diana accepts his proposal. The two get married in a royal wedding ceremony.

Cast
David Robb - Charles, Prince of Wales
Caroline Bliss - Lady Diana Spencer
Christopher Lee - Prince Philip, Duke of Edinburgh
Rod Taylor - Edward Adeane
Margaret Tyzack - Queen Elizabeth II
Mona Washbourne - Queen Elizabeth The Queen Mother
Charles Gray - John Spencer, 8th Earl Spencer
David Langton - Louis Mountbatten, 1st Earl Mountbatten of Burma
Susan Spencer - Lady Sarah Spencer
Jeremy Clyde - Andrew Parker Bowles
Jo Ross - Camilla Parker Bowles
Daniel Chatto - Prince Andrew
Patrick Bailey - Prince Edward
Shelagh MacLeod - Carolyn Pride
Jenifer Landor - Virginia Pitman
Caroline Goodall - Ann Bolton
Shirley Cassedy - Amanda Knatchbull
Julia St John - Jane Ward

Reception

The movie debuted on United States television on the ABC network on Friday, September 17, 1982, and was the 28th most watched show in America in that week. It was beaten by CBS's The Royal Romance of Charles and Diana, which became the most watched prime-time television show of the next week, with a 24.0 Nielsen rating and 37 share.

Production
The movie was filmed in Kensington and Westminster.

That the ABC and CBS films debuted three days apart was not a coincidence.  CBS had planned to show Royal Romance in December as a Hallmark-sponsored pre-Christmas film, but then moved the air date back to September, even before the official start of the new ratings season.  ABC then jumped their movie ahead of CBS, so late in the game that TV Guide did not list it.  When one reviewer asked to get a preview of either movie, he was told in one case "Are you kidding? They're still gluing the tape together."

References

External links

1982 television films
1982 films
1980s biographical drama films
1980s English-language films
American biographical drama films
Films about Diana, Princess of Wales
Biographical films about British royalty
Films directed by James Goldstone
1980s American films